Lo is a place in the Belgian province of West Flanders in Belgium and a borough of the municipality Lo-Reninge. Lo is a small medieval town and the community Lo-Reninge of which it is a part obtained the city title in 1985. The Old Town Hall of Lo, built between 1565-1566, and its belfry were inscribed on the UNESCO World Heritage List in 1999 as part of the Belfries of Belgium and France site.

Lo is notable as the location of Caesarsboom, an ancient European Yew designated a national monument of Belgium.

Gallery

See also
Jules Destrooper

References

External links

Cityreview.be

Populated places in West Flanders